The Cambridge University Constabulary is a body of constables that patrol the precincts of the University of Cambridge.  There are approximately 20 to 30 constables in the constabulary.  The university constables are commonly known as 'bulldogs'.  In reality, the constabulary acts as a security and stewarding service for the university with policing the responsibility of Cambridgeshire Constabulary; the university constabulary made no arrests between 2010–2015 and may not have made any in the previous 10 years either.

History
The power of the university to attest constables was granted by the Universities Act 1825, making the University Constabulary among the oldest police forces in the United Kingdom. As a non-Home Office police service, the chancellor and vice-chancellor of the university have the power to appoint constables (or in their absence any pro vice-chancellor or deputy vice-chancellor), which are in practice appointed and managed by the university's proctor's office. The Act states that these officers, once appointed, will have all the "powers and authorities, privileges, immunities, and advantages as any constables hath or shall have within his constablewick", within a  radius of the precincts of the university.  The precincts of the university are anywhere within  of Great St Mary's church together with Madingley Hall. However, it is stated on the Cambridge University website that they have jurisdiction within a  radius of Great St Mary's.

Until the 1960s the proctors and the constabulary conducted regular street-patrols within the university precincts. Nowadays they operate on a reactive basis when disorder or demonstrations are expected. Generally the constables restrict themselves to internal university matters with all serious crime/incidents being referred to the Cambridgeshire Constabulary, which is the territorial police force responsible for the whole of Cambridgeshire.

See also
Proctor
Law enforcement in the United Kingdom
List of law enforcement agencies in the United Kingdom, Crown Dependencies and British Overseas Territories
Oxford University Police
Campus police

References

External links
Official website
Images of Cambridge University Constabulary on Flickr
Further reading of Truncheons and Tipstaves.

Police forces of England
Constabulary
University police forces of the United Kingdom